Max Henny  ( – ) was a Dutch male footballer. He was part of the Netherlands national football team, playing 1 match on 1 April 1907.

See also
 List of Dutch international footballers

References

1885 births
1968 deaths
Dutch footballers
Netherlands international footballers
HFC Haarlem players
People from Bogor

Association footballers not categorized by position